Thirunainar Kurichi Madhavan Nair (1916-1965) was an Indian poet, novelist and lyricist. He was also an employee of Travancore Radio Station in Trivandrum, which later got merged with All India Radio. He was very active in Malayalam films from 1951 to 1965 and has written over 300 film songs of which most were hits. Thirunainar Kurichi and music director Brother Lakshmanan were a hit duo during the 1950s and 60s. Thirunainar Kurichi has also written numerous poems dramas and novels in the 1950s and 1960s.
 
Madhavan Nair was born at Thirunainarkurichi town near Velimala Murugan temple, which is around Colachel in Kanyakumari district of the present-day Tamil Nadu.

Born on 16 April 1916 to Raman Nair and Narayani Pillai, he lost his father at a  very young age. After education in Trivandrum and at his native place he took up a job as a teacher at a school in Colachel. He married Ponnamma and has a daughter named Jayashree. The film producer P. Subramaniam was his close friend and so the poet was the lyricist for the movies made in Subramaniam's Merryland Studios. His novel Maina was made into a Malayalam film Kattumaina. A writer of good novels like Paricharika, Pension Kunnu, Maina, Grama Seema, Kadamakalkkuvendi, Sarva Sakshi, Cheriya Valiyavan and Mayadevi, he is more famous as a poet. His famous songs include "Athmavidyalayame" from Harishchandra (1955) and "Ishwara Chinthaithonne Manujanu" from Bhakta Kuchela (1961). Most of his songs were tuned by Br. Lakshmanan and sung by Kamukara Purushothaman. He died aged 49 at Trivandrum Medical College on 1 April 1965. The cause of his death was cancer.

References

People from Kanyakumari district
People from Nagercoil
Indian male poets
Indian lyricists
Malayali people
Malayalam-language writers
Malayalam poets
Malayalam-language lyricists
1916 births
1965 deaths
20th-century Indian poets
Poets from Tamil Nadu
20th-century Indian male writers
Deaths from cancer in India